The Zenta class was a group of three protected cruisers built for the Austro-Hungarian Navy in the 1890s.

Design

The latter were intended to screen the battleships of the main fleet, scouting for enemy vessels and protecting them from torpedo boat attacks; they would also serve abroad on foreign stations. In a preliminary meeting on 22 January, the naval command issued a set of basic specifications for the projected small cruiser; the length was to be , and the ship should carry an armament of eight  guns and sixteen  guns. Since the speed of the new cruisers was the highest priority, the naval engineer Jakob Fassl held an evaluation in February to determine the best boiler to install in the vessels. Consideration was given to a number of boilers, including White-Forster, Thornycroft, and Locomotive boilers.

Work on the first vessel, provisionally titled "Kreuzer A", began on 8 August 1896, though the design would not be finalized for another nine months. During the lengthy design process, a number of changes were made. The torpedo tubes, originally planned to be in deck-mounted launchers, were moved to the hull above the waterline. The navy ultimately settled on Yarrow boilers for the ships, since it saved  compared to the other types. Triple-expansion steam engines were selected, but to achieve the high speed desired, they were installed "upside down", with the low-pressure cylinder in front of the higher-pressure cylinders. The second member of the class, "Kreuzer B", received a layer of Muntz metal over a layer of teak to protect her hull on long voyages. Several other navies similarly experimented with sheathing their steel cruiser hulls, but the practice failed to produce the desired results. Due to the rapid pace of technological development at the turn of the 20th century, the Zenta class was rapidly rendered obsolete, and already by 1910, they were in need of replacement.

Characteristics
Her crew numbered 308 officers and enlisted men. Her propulsion system consisted of a pair of triple-expansion steam engines each driving a screw propeller. Steam was provided by eight coal-fired Yarrow boilers.

The Zentas' main battery consisted of eight  40-caliber quick-firing guns manufactured by Škoda. One gun was mounted on the upper deck forward, six in casemates in the hull, and the remaining gun was placed on the upper deck aft. Their also carried four  44-cal. Škoda guns and two 47 mm 33-cal. Hotchkiss guns for defense against torpedo boats. These guns were all mounted individually, with four in the superstructure and the rest in casemates in the hull. They also carried a pair of Salvator-Dormus M1893  machine guns. Their armament was rounded out with a pair of  torpedo tubes that were carried in the hull above the waterline. The three Zenta-class cruisers were the first major Austro-Hungarian warships to carry an armament entirely manufactured by Škoda.

The ships' armor deck consisted of two layers of  steel over the bow and stern. Amidships, where it protected the propulsion machinery spaces, it doubled in thickness to a pair of  layers.

Ships

Citations

References
 

 
 
 
 
 
 

Cruiser classes